Hyperforin is a phytochemical produced by some of the members of the plant genus Hypericum, notably Hypericum perforatum (St John's wort). Hyperforin may be involved in the pharmacological effects of St. John's wort, specifically in its antidepressant effects.

Occurrence
Hyperforin has only been found in significant amounts in Hypericum perforatum with other related species such as Hypericum calycinum containing lower levels of the phytochemical. It accumulates in oil glands, pistils, and fruits, probably as a plant defensive compound. The first natural extractions were done with ethanol and afforded a 7:1 yield of crude extract to phytochemical however, this technique produced a mixture of hyperforin and adhyperforin. The extraction technique has since been modernized using lipophilic liquid CO2 extraction to afford a 3:1 crude to phytochemical extraction which is then further purified away from adhyperforin. This CO2 extraction is rather tricky still because typical 'supercritical' conditions extract less material whereas anything over 40 °C (100°F) will degrade hyperforin. Other Hypericum species contain low amounts of hyperforin.

Chemistry
Hyperforin is a prenylated phloroglucinol derivative and is a member of the Polycyclic polyprenylated acylphloroglucinol family, also known as the PPAP family. Hyperforin is a unique PPAP because it consists of a C8 quaternary stereocenter which was a synthetic challenge unlike other PPAP synthetic targets. The structure of hyperforin was elucidated by a research group from the Shemyakin Institute of Bio-organic Chemistry (USSR Academy of Sciences in Moscow) and published in 1975. A total synthesis of the non-natural hyperforin enantiomer was reported in 2010 which required approximately 50 synthetic transformations. In 2010, an enantioselective total synthesis of the correct enantiomer was disclosed. The retrosynthetic analysis was inspired by hyperforin's structural symmetry and biosynthetic pathway. The synthetic route undertaken generated a prostereogenic intermediate which then established the synthetically challenging C8 stereocenter and facilitated the stereochemical outcomes for the remainder of the synthesis.

Hyperforin is unstable in the presence of light and oxygen. Frequent oxidized forms contain a C3 to C9 hemiketal/heterocyclic bridge or will form furan/pyran derivatives.

Pharmacokinetics
Some pharmacokinetic data on hyperforin is available for an extract containing 5% hyperforin. Maximal plasma levels (Cmax) in human volunteers were reached 3–4 hours after administration of an extract containing 14.8 mg hyperforin. Biological half-life (t1/2) and mean residence time were 9 hours and 12 hours, respectively, with an estimated steady state plasma concentration of 100 ng/mL (approx. 180 nM) for 3 doses per day. Linear plasma concentrations were observed within a normal dosage range and no accumulation occurred.

In healthy male volunteers, 612 mg dry extract of St. John's wort produced hyperforin pharmacokinetics characterised by a half life of 19.64 hours.

Pharmacodynamics

Hyperforin may be a constituent responsible for the antidepressant and anxiolytic properties of the extracts of St. John's wort. In vitro, it acted as a reuptake inhibitor of monoamines (MRI), including serotonin, norepinephrine, dopamine, and of GABA and glutamate, with IC50 values of 0.05-0.10 μg/mL for all compounds, with the exception of glutamate, which is in the 0.5 μg/mL range. In other laboratory studies, hyperforin induced cytochrome P450 enzymes CYP3A4 and CYP2C9 by binding to and activating the pregnane X receptor.

Hyperforin Biosynthesis 
Hyperforin is a polyprenylated acylphloroglucinol (PPAP) derivative with a pholoroisobutyrophenone bicyclic core. Isobutryl-CoA (17) has been determined to be one of the initial primary metabolite starter molecules in the biosynthesis of the hyperforin core structure. Isobutryl-CoA is derived from an a-ketoisovalerate intermediate (15). The bicyclic structure suggests that it has elements of meroterpenoid origin. The nucleus of hyperforin is formed in a sequence condensation of one molecule of isobutyryl-CoA and three molecules of malonyl-CoA, both catalyzed by Isobutyrophenone synthase. Type III PKS enzymes will catalyze the decarboxylative condensation of enzyme active sites to generate scaffolding.

These enzymes preferred a different substrate and did not produce identical products. The cell-free extracts from the cell cultures were incubated with isobutyryl-CoA and malonyl-CoA, phlorisobutyrophenone was formed (18). THe enzymatic reaction was identified as BUS. PIVP is a similar function of enzyme in glandular hairs of hop cones. Two acylphloroglucinoal cores PICP and PIBP formed are formed by claisen condensation but will differ in substrate and enzyme specificities. PIVP will use isovaleryl-CoA in the presence of an enzyme VSP, and PIBP will use isobutyryl-CoA in the presence of bus resulting in the production of adhyperforin and hyperforin.  

However, hyperforin is an easily degradable compound highly sensitive to heat and light in its powder form or within a solution, making it difficult to determine a true synthesis route for hyperforin making this synthesis route a possible route.

Antidepressant research
Two meta-analyses of preliminary clinical trials evaluating the efficacy of St. John's wort for treating mild-to-moderate depression indicated a response similar to selective serotonin reuptake inhibitors and with better tolerance, although the long-term generalization of study results was limited by the short duration (4–12 weeks) of reviewed studies.

See also 
Hypericin

References

External links 

Antidepressants
Chemicals in Hypericum
CYP2D6 inhibitors
CYP3A4 inducers
Pregnane X receptor agonists